The Tree of Life, Stoclet Frieze (French: L'Arbre de Vie, Stoclet Frieze) is a painting by the Austrian symbolist painter Gustav Klimt. It was completed in 1909 and is based on the Art Nouveau (Modern) style in a symbolic painting genre.

The painting is a study for a series of three mosaics created by Klimt for a 1905-1911 commissioned work at the Palais Stoclet in Brussels, Belgium. The mosaics were created in the artist's Late Works period and depict swirling Trees of Life, a standing female figure, and an embracing couple. The mosaics are spread across three walls of the Palais' dining room, along with two figural sections set opposite each other.

The iconic painting later inspired the external facade of the "New Residence Hall" (also called the "Tree House"), a colorful 21-story student residence hall at Massachusetts College of Art and Design in Boston, Massachusetts.

See also
 Tree of Life
 Stoclet Frieze

References 

1909 paintings
Paintings by Gustav Klimt
Paintings in Vienna